Du-par's is a diner-style restaurant in Los Angeles, California, that was once a modest-sized regional chain. The first location was founded in 1938 at the Los Angeles Farmers Market by James Dunn and Edward Parsons, who combined their surnames to create the restaurant's name. There is also an associated franchised restaurant in a Las Vegas casino.

Overview
After 20 years of ownership, the Oberst family sold the chain in 2004 to an investment group led by W.W. "Biff" Naylor, son of noted California restaurateur Tiny Naylor (of Biff's and Tiny Naylor's restaurants) for an undisclosed amount. At the time of the sale, there were three locations: the original, at the Farmers Market; Studio City; and Thousand Oaks. After 31 years, Thousand Oaks was closed and was slated to be replaced by a shopping center in 1991. , the former Thousand Oaks location is currently occupied by The Original Pizza Cookery restaurant.

Du-par's expanded in 2009 to include several locations from the bankrupt Bakers Square chain. One of them, Du-Par's in Oxnard, closed in August 2012.

Another was in San Diego's Midway district. It closed in September 2015 and reopened in the Gaslamp Quarter in August 2016. That location closed in February 2017.

In 2014, it was announced that Du-par's was taking over a former Hamburger Hamlet in Pasadena.

In 2010, Du-par's expanded for the first time outside California by opening a restaurant-bakery in the Golden Gate Casino in Las Vegas, Nevada. A second Las Vegas-area location was opened in the Suncoast Hotel and Casino in April 2016. The Du-par's Restaurant & Bakery inside the Golden Gate Casino closed for financial reasons on February 7, 2017. In March 2017, Boyd Gaming, the owners of the Suncoast Hotel and Casino, signed a licensing agreement to assume management of the Du-par's restaurant in their casino while retaining the Du-par's name and recipes.

In May 2015, a new location was opened in Encino; it closed in November 2016.

The Studio City location closed on December 31, 2017.

The chain was purchased by former manager Frances Tario in 2018. The Pasadena location closed in 2020 as a result of the COVID-19 pandemic.

In July 2020, the struggling Farmers Market restaurant started carhop service to increase business during the ongoing COVID-19 pandemic, after trying the idea of selling pancake batter for pick-up orders in April 2020 when the governor of California forbade dining inside restaurants.

As of March 2023, the company operates 2 locations in California, and Nevada.

Media
Du-par's was featured in the Amazon Studios show Bosch. Main characters, including Harry Bosch and Eleanor Wish, dined at Du-par's during pivotal moments in Season 4.

See also
 List of pancake houses

References

External links 
 
 Archive of previous official website (2008–2016)

1938 establishments in California
Companies based in Los Angeles County, California
Pancake houses
Restaurant chains in the United States
Restaurants established in 1938
Restaurants in Greater Los Angeles
Restaurants in Los Angeles